Ronald Stephen Franz (October 20, 1945 – October 3, 2022) was an American professional basketball player who was a small forward in the American Basketball Association (ABA). After playing college basketball for the Kansas Jayhawks, Franz played in the ABA for the Oakland Oaks, New Orleans Buccaneers, Floridians, Memphis Tams, and Dallas Chaparrals from 1968 to 1973. He also played in Switzerland.

Career
Franz attended Bishop Ward High School in Kansas City, Kansas. He enrolled at the University of Kansas and played college basketball for the Kansas Jayhawks from 1963 to 1967. He was a three-year starting small forward for the Jayhawks. During the 1966–67 season, he served as team captain under coach Ted Owens.

The Detroit Pistons of the National Basketball Association (NBA) selected Franz in the fourth round of the 1967 NBA Draft. The Oakland Oaks of the rival upstart American Basketball Association (ABA) selected Franz in the 10th round of the ABA Draft. Franz chose to sign with Oakland. He played for the Oaks in the 1967–68 season. On June 18, 1968, the Oaks traded Franz, Steve Jones, and Barry Leibowitz to the New Orleans Buccaneers for Larry Brown and Doug Moe.

The Buccaneers traded Franz and Dave Nash to the Miami Floridians for Al Cueto, Wil Jones, and Erv Staggs on June 9, 1970. The Floridians folded in 1972, and the Memphis Tams selected Franz in a dispersal draft. Franz announced his retirement from basketball in December 1972. However, he signed with the Dallas Chaparrals in January 1973. Franz signed with Memphis for the 1974-75 ABA season, but he was cut.

Franz played for the Swiss Alpines of the European Professional Basketball League during its only season in 1975.

Personal life and death
After his playing career, Franz owned a construction company based in Memphis that built houses in Tennessee, Arkansas, and Florida. He and his wife, Georgia, retired to Fort Walton Beach, Florida.

Franz died in Fort Walton Beach on October 3, 2022, at the age of 76.

References

External links

1945 births
2022 deaths
American men's basketball players
Basketball players from Kansas
Dallas Chaparrals players
Detroit Pistons draft picks
Kansas Jayhawks men's basketball players
Memphis Tams players
Miami Floridians players
New Orleans Buccaneers players
Oakland Oaks players
Sportspeople from Kansas City, Kansas
People from Fort Walton Beach, Florida
Small forwards